Alfred Perceval Graves (22 July 184627 December 1931), was an Anglo-Irish poet, songwriter and folklorist. He was the father of British poet and critic Robert Graves.

Early life 
Graves was born in Dublin and was the son of The Rt Rev. Charles Graves, Church of Ireland Lord Bishop of Limerick, Ardfert and Aghadoe, and his wife Selina, the daughter of Dr John Cheyne (1777–1836), the Physician-General to the British Forces in Ireland. His sister was Ida Margaret Graves Poore. His paternal grandmother Helena was a Perceval, and the granddaughter of the Earl of Egmont. His grandfather, John Crosbie Graves, was a first cousin of "Ireland's most celebrated surgeon", Robert James Graves.

Alfred was educated both in England, at Windermere College, Westmorland, and in Ireland, at Trinity College Dublin. As an undergraduate he contributed to the literary magazine Kottabos, starting in 1869.

His first poem appeared in the Dublin University Magazine in 1863. He graduated with a Master of Arts degree. In 1869, he entered the Civil Service as clerk in the British Home Office, where he remained until he became an Inspector of Schools in 1874.

Author
Graves was a contributor of prose and verse to The Spectator, Athenaeum, John Bull, and Punch.

For a time he lived at Red Branch House on Laurieton Road, Wimbledon, London.

He took a leading part in the late 19th-century renewal of Irish literature. He was for several years president of the Irish Literary Society, and he was the author of the comic song Father O'Flynn and many other songs and ballads. In collaboration with Charles Villiers Stanford, he published Songs of Old Ireland (1882) and Irish Songs and Ballads (1893), the airs of which are taken from the Petrie manuscripts; the airs of his Irish Folk-Songs (1897) were arranged by Charles Wood with whom he also collaborated on Songs of Erin (1901). Composer Mary Augusta Wakefield also set at least one of his poems to music.

He published an autobiography, To Return to All That, in 1930, as a response to his son Robert's World War I memoir, Good-Bye to All That.

Later life
Graves built a large house, named "Erinfa", near Harlech, Wales, which he used as a summer retreat and where he spent his retirement. He had a keen interest in the Welsh language and the culture of Wales; he was elected as a Welsh bard in the National Eisteddfod of Wales at Bangor in 1902.

He died in Harlech in 1931.

Legacy
Graves’ obituary in The Spectator concluded: "Mr Graves not only wrote songs but stirred up fresh public interest in the old folk-songs of Ireland, Wales and the Highlands, and, moreover, induced musicians and singers to become interested too. Keeping clear of politics, he did a great work for the popularizing of good music and good poetry in which Celt and Saxon may share."

Family
Graves' marriage to Jane Cooper, (29 December 187424 March 1886) of Cooper's Hill, County Limerick, resulted in five children:

 Philip Perceval, b. 25 February 1876 (or 1870), m. Millicent Gilchrist. Died in 1953.
 Mary, b. 6 June 1877, d. circa 1949. m. Arthur Sansome Preston.
 Richard Massie, b. 14 September 1880, d. 14 August 1960, m. Eva Wilkinson, 1912.
 Alfred Perceval ("Bones"), b. 14 December 1881, m. Eirene Gwen Knight, singer.
 Susan Winthrop Savatier Graves, b. 23 March 1885, m. Kenneth Macaulay.

After the death of his first wife, Graves married Amalie (Amy) Elizabeth Sophie (or Sophia) von Ranke, on 30 December 1891. The couple had five children:

 Clarissa, b. 29 November 1892. Poet, artist and Christian Science practitioner.
 Rosaleen-Louise, b. 7 March 1894, d. 3 August 1989. m. James Francis Cooper.
 Robert Graves, also known as Robert von Ranke, b. 24 July 1895, d. 7 December 1985, poet, critic and author of I, Claudius, Good-Bye to All That and other novels.
 Charles Patrick Ranke Graves, b. 1899, d. 1971, journalist and writer.
 John Tiarks Ranke, b. 1903, d. 1980. m. Mary Wickens.

References

External links 

 Songs of Old Ireland: A Collection of Fifty Irish Melodies with words by Alfred Perceval Graves and music arranged by Charles Villiers Stanford
 
 
 

1846 births
1931 deaths
Irish Anglicans
Graves, AP
Irish folklorists
Graves family
People from Gwynedd